The Ulster Hurling Minor Championship is an annual hurling competition organised by the Ulster Council of the Gaelic Athletic Association since 1930 for the youngest competitors (under-18) in the province of Ulster in Ireland.  It is sponsored by the Electricity Supply Board and therefore officially known as the ESB Ulster GAA Hurling Minor Championship.

The series of games are played during the summer months with the Ulster final currently being played on the last Sunday of June. The minor final provides the curtain-raiser to the senior final. The prize for the winning team is the Minor Hurling Cup. 

The Ulster Championship is a part of the wider All-Ireland Minor Hurling Championship. The winners of the Ulster final advance directly to the quarter-final stage of the All-Ireland series of games.

Only a handful of teams currently participate in the Ulster Championship, due to dominance of Gaelic football in the province.

Top winners

Roll of honour

References

External links
 Roll of Honour on gaainfo.com
 Complete Roll of Honour on Kilkenny GAA bible

5